Perth-hir House, Rockfield, Monmouthshire, Wales, was a major residence of the Herbert family. It stood at a bend of the River Monnow, to the north-west of the village. At its height in the 16th century, the mansion, entered by two drawbridges over a moat, comprised a great hall and a number of secondary structures. Subsequently in the ownership of the Powells, and then the Lorimers, the house became a centre of Catholic recusancy following the English Reformation. By the 19th century, the house had declined to the status of a farmhouse and it was largely demolished in around 1830. Its ruins, and the site which contains considerable remnants of a Tudor garden, are a scheduled monument.

History
The Herbert family is an Anglo-Welsh noble family that rose to prominence under William Herbert, the son of William ap Thomas, the builder of Raglan Castle. The family traditionally claimed descent from the Jenkins of Wern-ddu, a farmhouse in the north of the county. The American journalist and diplomat Wirt Sikes, United States consul at Cardiff in the 1870s and 1880s, recorded an encounter between Wern-ddu's last hereditary owner, Roger ap Probert, and a stranger, in his Rambles and Studies in Old South Wales, published in 1881. Questioned as to the history of the house, Probert replied; "Werndu (is) a very ancient house. Out of it came the Earls of Pembroke, the Lords Herbert of Cherbury, the Herberts of Coldbrook, the Joneses of Treowen and Llanarth and all the Powells; also, by the female line, came the Dukes of Beaufort". Sir Joseph Bradney, in his multi-volume work on the county, A History of Monmouthshire from the Coming of the Normans into Wales down to the Present Time, suggests that Perth-hir was bought from the de Clares in the 14th century by Thomas ap Thomas, fourth son of Gwilym ap Jenkin.

Following the English Reformation, Monmouthshire, particularly the northern part of the county, was an area noted for recusancy. Its relative remoteness, and the patronage of a number of powerful Catholic families, led by the Marquesses of Worcester (later Dukes of Beaufort) of Raglan Castle, enabled Catholic priests to operate with a degree of safety. The later owners of Perth-hir, the Powells and the Lorimers, were strongly Catholic in their sympathies. Their home became a refuge for Catholic priests and services were held in a small chapel, dedicated to St Catherine, which existed until the mid-18th century. The most notable priest in residence was Matthew Pritchard (or Prichard) (1669-1750), Catholic bishop and Vicar Apostolic of the Western District for much of the first half of the 18th century. The local church at Rockfield, St Cenedlon's became a place of burial, in contravention of the prevailing ecclesiastical laws, and a number of priests were laid to rest in the churchyard, while Pritchard is interned within the church itself.

At the beginning of the 19th century, Perth-hir became a popular attraction, as an extension of the Wye Tour. Both William Coxe and John Thomas Barber Beaumont described their visits in volumes published in 1801 and 1803. By this time, the house was already in decline, Coxe recording that the owner during his visit, Mr John Powell Lorimer, had "took down a part of the house, containing 13 bed chambers and other offices". Barber Beaumont describes the remains as a "diminished and patched-up building; … but a sorry remnant of past opulence." Within 30 years the house was almost entirely demolished.

South of the house, towards the B4347 Skenfrith-Monmouth road, are the ruins of Perthir Mill, the first paper mill established in Wales. D. G. Tucker gives a date for the mill of c. 1700.

Architecture and description
The site of Perth-hir stands in a bend of the River Monnow, to the north-west of Rockfield village. Perth-hir appears to have been rectangular in plan, covering an area of roughly 50M square. Evidence of the moat, referenced by both Coxe and Barker Beaumont, remains.  Cadw dates the mansion to the 16th century, while the Royal Commission on the Ancient and Historical Monuments of Wales (RCAHMW) favours a slightly earlier date in the 15th. The extant remains comprise a section of wall, with an inset window, some 6M in length, and between 2 and 3M high. Fox and Raglan note the window's "ogee arch", a popular style in Monmouthshire at that date. The house was obviously of some grandeur; Coxe referenced the "long and lofty" great hall, and Peter Smith, in his study, Houses of the Welsh Countryside, records both an "ornate roof", and evidence of decorative heraldry.

The garden surrounding the site of the house is also recorded by the RCAHMW. It dates the gardens to the 15th century and notes their considerable extent, 68m by 88m. Part of a tower, or turret, stands at the eastern edge of the garden. RCAHMW is clear that it was not a dovecote but is uncertain as to its purpose. The remains of the house, and its site, are a scheduled monument.

Notes

References

Sources

External links
 RCAHMW map of the site

Scheduled monuments in Monmouthshire
Archaeological sites in Monmouthshire
Buildings and structures in Monmouthshire
History of Monmouthshire